Nogueirapis is a genus of bees belonging to the family Apidae.

The species of this genus are found in Southern America.

Species:

Nogueirapis batistai 
Nogueirapis butteli 
Nogueirapis costaricana 
Nogueirapis minor 
Nogueirapis mirandula 
Nogueirapis rosariae

References

Apidae